A jim crow or rail bender is a tool for bending rails, consisting of a U-shaped or V-shaped armature with a hefty screw rod in its axis. Deluxe models are outfitted with rollers for continuous bending.

Practice 

The jim crow is needed to bend rails to tighter radii, especially near the ends.

References

External links
 http://www.catskillarchive.com/rrextra/tkwk03.Html (with illustration)
 Photograph
 Railway Object Name Thesaurus

Tools
Permanent way